Just Keep Eating is the only full-length album by the Austin, Texas noise rock band Scratch Acid. Although it was only released on vinyl, it can be found as tracks 9-21 on the compilation album The Greatest Gift.

Accolades

Track listing

Personnel 
Scratch Acid
Brett Bradford – guitar, vocals on "Holes"
David Wm. Sims – bass guitar, piano, guitar on "Holes"
Rey Washam – drums, piano on "Ain't That Love", "Holes" and "Cheese Plug"
David Yow – vocals, bass guitar on "Holes"
Production and additional personnel
Tay Blations – harmonica on "Unlike a Baptist"
George Horn – mastering
Anthony Johnson – additional guitar on "Ain't That Love?"
Fred Remmert – engineering

References

External links 
 

1986 debut albums
Scratch Acid albums